Sauromatum venosum  (syn. Typhonium venosum) is a species of plant in the arum family, Araceae. It is native to Asia and Africa, where it grows in forests and riparian meadows.

It is grown as an ornamental plant. Its common names include voodoo lily and monarch of the East

Description
This species grows from a tuber, producing an inflorescence with a yellowish spathe covered in large purple spots and a purple spadix. The green leaf appears after the inflorescence develops. It has 9 to 11 leaflets each up to 40 centimeters long borne on a tall petiole. The mature flowers emit an odor described as "putrid" and compared to rotting meat. The odor is attractive to insects such as flies, which pollinate the plant. Like some other aroids it is a thermogenic plant, generating its own heat.

In cultivation
This is a readily cultivated plant, popular as an ornamental. The Missouri Botanical Garden suggests growing it far away from windows and walkways "where the brief but overpowering odor from the spadices will be found objectionable".

Notes

References
 Hetterscheid, W. & P. C. Boyce. 2000. a reclassification of Sauromatum Schott and new species of Typhonium Schott (Araceae). Aroideana 23: 48–55.
 Cusimano, N., M. Barrett, W. L. A. Hetterscheid, and S. S. Renner. 2010. A phylogeny of the Areae implies that Typhonium, Sauromatum, and the Australian species of Typhonium are distinct clades. Taxon 59(2): 439–447.
 

Aroideae
Thermogenic plants